David Morier, (1705? –  8 January 1770) was an Anglo-Swiss painter of portraits, military subjects and historical scenes around and after the time of the War of the Austrian Succession and the related Jacobite rising of 1745. His most recognisable work is An Incident in the Rebellion of 1745.

Morier thrived during the 1750s under the patronage of the Duke of Cumberland, the effective commander-in-chief of the British Army. He produced a number of equestrian portraits of his patron and other senior officers, as well as his greatest series of works, known as the Grenadier Paintings, which document the uniforms and equipment of the Army in the years leading up to the Seven Years' War. After the Duke lost his position due to his inept leadership in this new war, Morier's career went into decline. He was jailed for debt in the Fleet prison in 1769 and died there early the next year.

Coming to Britain

Little is known of Morier's early life; even his exact year of birth is unknown. He arrived in England in 1743, and by some means obtained the patronage of the Duke during the next two years. He accompanied the Duke's army to Scotland, and while he may have been an eye-witness at the Battle of Culloden, the subject of his famous painting; he did have the opportunity to make sketches of the clothing and arms of the Jacobite prisoners in the aftermath.

Morier's most famous painting - An Incident in the Rebellion of 1745 - depicts the Highland charge at the climax of the Battle of Culloden, when the charging Highlanders faced off against Col. Barrell's 4th Regiment of Foot. The painting remains the best contemporary source on the material culture of both the British and the Jacobite forces in this conflict.

The Grenadier Paintings

With the coming of peace in 1748, the Duke wished to have the army's appearance recorded and chose Morier for the job, paying him a salary of 200 pounds sterling per year.

Probably beginning in 1749, Morier created the Grenadier Paintings, large panels depicting the uniforms and the equipment of each of the (at that time) 49 regiments of marching infantry, plus the three regiments of the Guards infantry. On each panel three grenadier privates of three different regiments are portrayed, in numerical order and in a variety of poses, from formal drill to route march order. Once again, Morier's care and attention to detail have provided a very valuable record of the British Army's material culture in this period, which is drawn upon by historians and reenactors to this day.

Less well-known, but equally important, Morier also painted depictions of the cavalry regiments of the army. When he was finished, his patron had a visual record of every regular British regiment that had ever come under his command.

Later years
In 1757, the Duke's military career was ended by his disgrace following his defeat at the Battle of Hastenbeck and his subsequent signing of the Convention of Klosterzeven, and Morier appears to have lost his patronage either then, or at the Duke's death in 1765.

Morier exhibited at the first exhibition of the Society of Artists in 1760, and again in 1762, 1765, and 1768, sending equestrian portraits, and in the last year An Old Horse and the Farmer. By 1769 Morier was deeply in debt, and was confined to Fleet Prison. He died there in early January, 1770, at the approximate age of 65 years. His colleagues of the Society paid to have him buried at St. James's Church, Clerkenwell, London.

Notes

Attribution

1710s births
1770 deaths
Swiss male painters
British male painters
Inmates of Fleet Prison